William Garnett Duncan (March 2, 1800 – May 25, 1875) was a United States representative from Kentucky. He was born in Louisville, Kentucky. He completed preparatory studies and was graduated from Yale College in 1821. He studied law and was admitted to the bar in 1822 and commenced practice in Louisville, Kentucky.

Duncan was elected as a Whig to the Thirtieth Congress (March 4, 1847 – March 3, 1849) but declined to be a candidate for renomination in 1848. After leaving Congress, he moved to Louisiana and settled in New Orleans, Louisiana in 1850, where he continued the practice of law.

Retiring from active law practice in 1860, Duncan traveled in Europe. He resided for a while in Paris, France before returning to the United States in 1875 to Louisville, Kentucky. He died in that city on May 25, 1875, and was buried in Cave Hill Cemetery.

References

External links
 

1800 births
1875 deaths
Politicians from Louisville, Kentucky
Burials at Cave Hill Cemetery
Whig Party members of the United States House of Representatives from Kentucky
19th-century American politicians
Yale College alumni